Adventure Time is an American fantasy animated television series created by Pendleton Ward for Cartoon Network, the show premiered on April 5, 2010 and ended on September 3, 2018 with ten seasons and three miniseries. Throughout its run the series received critical acclaim and several awards and nominations, since 2010 the show was nominated every year until 2017 at the Annie Awards, the main award ceremony for animation, winning three awards from nineteen nominations overall. The show won eight Primetime Emmy Awards out of sixteen nominations; additionally, the Distant Lands specials were nominated for three Daytime Emmy Awards.

Annie Awards
The Annie Awards are accolades presented since 1972 by the Los Angeles branch of the International Animated Film Association, ASIFA-Hollywood to recognize excellence in animation shown in cinema and television.

British Academy Children's Awards
The British Academy Children's Awards are presented annually since 1996 by the British Academy of Film and Television Arts (BAFTA).

Critics' Choice Television Award
The Critics' Choice Television Awards are accolades that are presented annually since 2011 by the Critics Choice Association (CCA).

Eisner Awards
The Will Eisner Comic Industry Awards, commonly shortened to the Eisner Awards, are prizes given for creative achievement in American comic books.

Emmy Awards

Daytime Emmy Awards
The Daytime Emmy Award is an American award bestowed by the National Academy of Television Arts and Sciences (NATAS) in recognition of excellence in American daytime television programming.

Primetime Emmy Awards 
The Primetime Emmy Award is an American award bestowed by the Academy of Television Arts & Sciences (ATAS) in recognition of excellence in American primetime television programming.

Harvey Awards
The Harvey Awards are given for achievement in comic books.

TCA Awards
The TCA Awards are awards presented by the Television Critics Association in recognition of excellence in television.

Various other awards and nominations

References

External links 
 

 
Lists of awards by animated television series